Systems science, also referred to as systems research, or, simply, systems, is an interdisciplinary field concerned with understanding systems—from simple to complex—in nature, society, cognition, engineering, technology and science itself. The field is diverse, spanning the formal, natural, social, and applied sciences.

To systems scientists, the world can be understood as a system of systems. The field aims to develop interdisciplinary foundations that are applicable in a variety of areas, such as psychology, biology, medicine, communication, business management, technology, computer science, engineering,  and social sciences.

Systems science covers formal sciences such as complex systems, cybernetics, dynamical systems theory, information theory, linguistics or systems theory. It has applications in the field of the natural and social sciences and engineering, such as control theory, systems design, operations research, social systems theory, systems biology, system dynamics, human factors, systems ecology, computer science, systems engineering and systems psychology. Themes commonly stressed in system science are (a) holistic view, (b) interaction between a system and its embedding environment, and (c) complex (often subtle) trajectories of dynamic behavior that sometimes are stable (and thus reinforcing), while at various 'boundary conditions' can become wildly unstable (and thus destructive). Concerns about Earth-scale biosphere/geosphere dynamics is an example of the nature of problems to which systems science seeks to contribute meaningful insights.

Associated fields 

The systems sciences are a broad array of fields. One way of conceiving of these is in three groups: fields that have developed systems ideas primarily through theory; those that have done so primarily through practical engagements with problem situations; and those that have applied systems ideas in the context of other disciplines.

Theoretical fields

Chaos and dynamical systems

Complexity

Control theory

 Affect control theory
 Control engineering
 Control systems

Cybernetics

 Autopoiesis
 Conversation theory
 Engineering cybernetics
 Perceptual control theory
 Management cybernetics
 Second-order cybernetics

Information theory

General systems theory

 Systems theory in anthropology
 Biochemical systems theory
 Ecological systems theory
 Developmental systems theory
 General systems theory
 Living systems theory
 LTI system theory
 Social systems
 Sociotechnical systems theory
 Mathematical system theory
 World-systems theory

Hierarchy Theory

Practical fields

Critical systems thinking

Operations research and management science

Soft systems methodology 

The soft systems methodology was developed in England by academics at the University of Lancaster Systems Department through a ten-year action research programme. The main contributor is Peter Checkland (born 18 December 1930, in Birmingham, UK), a British management scientist and emeritus professor of systems at Lancaster University.

Systems analysis

Systems analysis branch of systems science that analyzes systems, the interactions within those systems, or interaction with its environment, often prior to their automation as computer models. Systems analysis is closely associated with the RAND corporation.

Systemic design

Systemic design integrates methodologies from systems thinking with advanced design practices to address complex, multi-stakeholder situations.

Systems dynamics

System dynamics is an approach to understanding the behavior of complex systems over time. It offers "simulation technique for modeling business and social systems", which deals with internal feedback loops and time delays that affect the behavior of the entire system.  What makes using system dynamics different from other approaches to studying complex systems is the use of feedback loops and stocks and flows.

Systems engineering 

Systems engineering (SE) is an interdisciplinary field of engineering, that focuses on the development and organization of complex systems. It is the "art and science of creating whole solutions to complex problems",  for example: signal processing systems, control systems and communication system, or other forms of high-level modelling and design in specific fields of engineering.
  Aerospace systems
 Biological systems engineering
 Earth systems engineering and management
  Electronic systems
 Enterprise systems engineering
 Software systems
 Systems analysis

Applications in other disciplines

Earth system science 

  Climate systems
 Systems geology

Systems biology 

 Computational systems biology
 Synthetic biology
 Systems immunology
 Systems neuroscience

Systems chemistry

Systems ecology 

 Ecosystem ecology
 Agroecology

Systems psychology 

 Ergonomics
 Family systems theory
 Systemic therapy

Systems scientists 

General systems scientists can be divided into different generations. The founders of the systems movement like Ludwig von Bertalanffy, Kenneth Boulding, Ralph Gerard, James Grier Miller, George J. Klir, and Anatol Rapoport were all born between 1900 and 1920. They came from different natural and social science disciplines and joined forces in the 1950s to establish the general systems theory paradigm. Along with the organization of their efforts a first generation of systems scientists rose.

Among them were other scientists like Ackoff, Ashby, Margaret Mead and Churchman, who popularized the systems concept in the 1950s and 1960s. These scientists inspired and educated a second generation with more notable scientists like Ervin Laszlo (1932) and Fritjof Capra (1939), who wrote about systems theory in the 1970s and 1980s. Others got acquainted and started studying these works in the 1980s and started writing about it since the 1990s. Debora Hammond can be seen as a typical representative of these third generation of general systems scientists.

Organizations 

The International Society for the Systems Sciences (ISSS) is an organisation for interdisciplinary collaboration and synthesis of systems sciences. The ISSS is unique among systems-oriented institutions in terms of the breadth of its scope, bringing together scholars and practitioners from academic, business, government, and non-profit organizations. Based on fifty years of tremendous interdisciplinary research from the scientific study of complex systems to interactive approaches in management and community development. This society was initially conceived in 1954 at the Stanford Center for Advanced Study in the Behavioral Sciences by Ludwig von Bertalanffy, Kenneth Boulding, Ralph Gerard, and Anatol Rapoport.

In the field of systems science the International Federation for Systems Research (IFSR) is an international federation for global and local societies in the field of systems science. This federation is a non-profit, scientific and educational agency founded in 1981, and constituted of some thirty member organizations from various countries. The overall purpose of this Federation is to advance cybernetic and systems research and systems applications and to serve the international systems community.

The best known research institute in the field is the Santa Fe Institute (SFI) located in Santa Fe, New Mexico, United States, dedicated to the study of complex systems. This institute was founded in 1984 by George Cowan, David Pines, Stirling Colgate, Murray Gell-Mann, Nick Metropolis, Herb Anderson, Peter A. Carruthers, and Richard Slansky. All but Pines and Gell-Mann were scientists with Los Alamos National Laboratory. SFI's original mission was to disseminate the notion of a separate interdisciplinary research area, complexity theory referred to at SFI as complexity science. Recently, IIT Jodhpur in Rajasthan, India started inculcating system science and engineering to its students through Bachelors, Masters and Doctorate programs. This makes it the first institution to offer system science education to students in India.

See also 

 
 Antireductionism
 Evolutionary prototyping
 Holism
 Cybernetics
 System engineering
 System Dynamics
 Systemics
 System equivalence
 Systems theory
 Tektology
 World-systems theory
 Complex Systems

References

Further reading 
 B. A. Bayraktar, Education in Systems Science, 1979, 369 pp.
 Kenneth D. Bailey, "Fifty Years of Systems Science:Further Reflections", Systems Research and Behavioral Science, 22, 2005, pp. 355–361. 
 Robert L. Flood, Ewart R Carson, Dealing with Complexity: An Introduction to the Theory and Application of Systems Science (2nd Edition), 1993.
 George J. Klir, Facets of Systems Science (2nd Edition), Kluwer Academic/Plenum Publishers, 2001.
 Jiri Kroc, Karel Balihar, Martin Matejovic, Complex Systems and Their Use in Medicine: Concepts, Methods and Bio-Medical Applications, ResearchGate, 2019.
 Ervin László, Systems Science and World Order: Selected Studies, 1983.
 G. E. Mobus & M. C. Kalton, Principles of Systems Science, 2015, New York:Springer.
 Anatol Rapoport (ed.), General Systems: Yearbook of the Society for the Advancement of General Systems Theory, Society for General Systems Research, Vol 1., 1956.
 Li D. Xu, "The contributions of Systems Science to Information Systems Research", Systems Research and Behavioral Science, 17, 2000, pp. 105–116.
 Graeme Donald Snooks, "A general theory of complex living systems: Exploring the demand side of dynamics", Complexity, vol. 13, no. 6, July/August 2008.
 John N. Warfield,  "A proposal for Systems Science", Systems Research and Behavioral Science, 20, 2003, pp. 507–520. 
 Michael C. Jackson, Critical Systems Thinking and the Management of Complexity, 2019 , Wiley.

External links

 Principia Cybernetica Web
Institute of System Science Knowledge (ISSK.org)
 International Society for the System Sciences
 UK Systems Society
 Cybernetics Society

 
Science
Cybernetics
Formal sciences
Science
Emergence